Qionglong Mountain is the highest mountain of Suzhou, Jiangsu Province. It is located in southwest of Suzhou, whose elevation is 341.7m. One of the most famous ancient Chinese military strategist Sun Tzu lived here after retirement, and he wrote the masterpiece The Art of War here. Qionglong Mountain has the longest sky way in Suzhou and the only provincial natural reserve in Suzhou as well.

References

AAAAA-rated tourist attractions
Mountains of Suzhou
Wuzhong District